Hollow is a 2022 young adult graphic novel by Shannon Waters and Brandon Boyer-White based on "The Legend of Sleepy Hollow". The graphic novel was illustrated by Berenice Nelle.

Synopsis 
The story is a modern retelling of the "Sleepy Hollow" legend and follows Isabel "Izzy" Crane, a high school student who recently moved to Sleepy Hollow from New York City. Izzy befriends Vicky Van Tassel and Croc Brun, but the three soon realize that an ancient curse is following the Van Tassel family.

Publishing history 
It was published by Boom! Box, as a print and digital comic.

Reception 
The graphic novel received praise for its art style and writing, as well as its portrayal of diverse characters, including the queer protagonist. An advance review by Ariel Dyer for Comicon.com wrote that it "adds its own unique spin touching on queer romance, high school pranks, and the pressures of family legacy and growing up- all while wrapping readers in a cozy, New England blanket for Halloween season."

Holly Woodbury of AIPT Comics wrote that the colorist's "paint the world of Sleepy Hollow with warm oranges and yellows in the day and cool blues and sickly greens at night" and that main and background characters are drawn with detail and variety.

References 

2022 graphic novels
LGBT-related young adult novels
Works based on The Legend of Sleepy Hollow
Boom! Studios titles
LGBT-related graphic novels
Young adult comics
Horror graphic novels